Gösta Fredrik Gahm (7 July 1942 - 27 December 2020) was a Swedish astronomer.

Gösta Gahm was the professor emeritus of astronomy at Stockholm University. He was, until 2010, the chairman of the Swedish Astronomical Society, and was the main initiator of the popular science project Sweden Solar System.

10997 Gahm, a main-belt asteroid discovered on 2 September 1978, is named in honour of Gahm.

References

20th-century Swedish astronomers
Academic staff of Stockholm University
Stockholm University alumni
1942 births
Living people
21st-century Swedish astronomers